Kseniya Alexandrova (born 12 November 1994) is a Russian model, host, actress, and beauty pageant titleholder. She was first runner-up at the Miss Russia 2017 pageant and later represented Russia at the Miss Universe 2017 pageant.

Life and career
Alexandrova was born and raised in Moscow.

Pageantry

Miss Russia 2017
Alexandrova represented Moscow in the Miss Russia 2017 competition, and placed as first runner-up. She succeeded outgoing Miss Russia 2016 1st Runner-up and Miss Universe Russia 2016 Yuliana Korolkova.

Miss Universe 2017
Alexandrova represented Russia at the Miss Universe 2017 competition, but did not place in the Top 16 semifinalists. The pageant was won by Demi-Leigh Nel-Peters of South Africa.

References

	
	
	
	
	
	
	
	

	

Living people
1994 births
Female models from Moscow
Miss Universe 2017 contestants
Russian beauty pageant winners